Álvaro Antón Ripoll (born 18 May 1994) is a Spanish footballer who plays as a right winger. In 2014, he played for UD Alzira in the group VI of the 2014–15 Tercera División, the fourth division of Spanish football. He played four times for FC Cincinnati in the 2016 USL season.

References

External links

 
 Álvaro Anton Ripoll on FC Cincinnati's website

1994 births
Living people
Spanish footballers
Footballers from the Community of Madrid
Association football wingers
Tercera División players
CA Osasuna B players
AD Alcorcón B players
USL Championship players
FC Cincinnati (2016–18) players
Spanish expatriate footballers
Spanish expatriate sportspeople in the United States
Expatriate soccer players in the United States